The 1969 Central American and Caribbean Championships in Athletics were held at the Estadio Juan Abrantes in Havana, Cuba between 17–19 August.

Medal summary

Men's events

Women's events

Medal table

External links
Men Results – GBR Athletics
Women Results – GBR Athletics

Central American and Caribbean Championships in Athletics
Central American and Caribbean Championships
International athletics competitions hosted by Cuba
Sport in Havana
Athletics